Guy Katsav (born April 1980) is a British record producer, mixing engineer and remixer based in London.

Biography
His selected credits include mixing a no. 1 album by The View and a Mercury award nominated album of 2011 Brit award winner - Laura Marling. He has engineered for David Guetta, Groove Armada, The Streets, Gossip, Akon, Noah and The Whale, Moby, Orchestral Manoeuvres in the Dark, Killa Kela, Bonobo, Kano, De La soul, Mr. Hudson and Lisa Marie Presley, among many others. Katsav worked at Soho Recording Studios for nine years and, in 2013, launched his own Denmark Street Studios in Denmark Street. Recently he has produced for Gangsta-Nerd duo Tigermonkey, Do The Mobot for Mo Farah, Gypsy Hill and Sway.

References

External links
 Guy Katsav at Myspace
 Soho Recording Studio

British record producers
Living people
1980 births